The Kingston Bridge is a balanced cantilever dual-span ten lane road bridge made of triple-cell segmented prestressed concrete box girders crossing the River Clyde in Glasgow, Scotland.

Carrying the M8 motorway through the city centre, the Kingston Bridge is one of the busiest bridges in Europe, carrying around 150,000 vehicles every day.

History
The name of the bridge refers to the Kingston area on the south of the river.  The erstwhile Kingston Dock which was located on the south bank of the river was closed to allow for construction of the bridge. It had been completed in 1867 between Windmillcroft Quay and the former headquarters of the Scottish Co-operative Wholesale Society
on Morrison Street, adjacent to where the bridge now stands. It was Glasgow's first enclosed dock. The dock was eventually closed to navigation in 1966, when work began on the construction of the Kingston Bridge; the basin was subsequently filled in and housing built on the site. At the time of construction, however, the Clyde Port Authority still insisted that the bridge have a clearance height of 18 m (60 ft) in order to allow dredgers to go upstream as far as the King George V Bridge. 

Kingston Bridge was first proposed in 1945 as part of the Glasgow Inner Ring Road scheme. After feasibility studies were carried out, William Fairhurst was appointed consulting engineer for the design of the bridge and its approaches and on 15 May 1967 construction began. Construction was a joint venture between Logan and Marples Ridgway. The eventual cost was £2.4m excluding the approach viaducts (or around £11m in total). On 26 June 1970 Kingston Bridge was opened by Queen Elizabeth the Queen Mother.

Location
The bridge connects Anderston and the city centre at Junction 18/19 with Kingston, Tradeston and the Gorbals at Junction 20. It consists of two parallel spans, each 21 m (68 ft) wide, with each supporting a five lane deck. The eastern span carries southbound traffic and the western span carries northbound traffic over the river. The approaches to the bridge are also linked with many junctions of their own, including major city centre ramps and the M77, that are two lanes wide. The outer spandrels of the bridge are clad with exposed-aggregate panels showing vertical joints.

Refurbishment
When opened by Queen Elizabeth the Queen Mother in 1970, the bridge was designed to handle 120,000 vehicles a day. By 1990, the sheer excess volume and weight of traffic, combined with poor design and flaws in construction, resulted in serious structural deterioration. A decade-long repair and renovation programme was initiated to repair and strengthen the bridge. These repairs have involved strengthening the quay walls and jacking-up the 52,000-tonne deck of the bridge, while still operational, to allow the construction of new supporting piers, before lowering the bridge back onto the new, more robust supports. It was described by the contractor, Balfour Beatty, as one of the most ambitious civil engineering projects to take place in the city. Indeed, the operation involved 128 hydraulic jacks, making it the biggest ever bridge lift, qualifying for the Guinness Book of Records.

A longer-term attempt to solve the problem of chronic congestion is the M74 northern extension, to act as the southern flank of the unbuilt Glasgow Inner Ring Road first planned in the 1960s. The existing "ski ramp" where the Inner Ring was intended to continue on has remained unused; the extended M74 meets the M8 secondary carriageways a few hundred metres further south at Scotland Street. This change of plan from the Scottish Executive was because of the Kingston Bridge's inability to handle an increase in traffic: the thinking was that the increased traffic from the new road would not then go straight over the bridge and would enable traffic from the south east, heading west to Ayrshire, Glasgow International Airport, Glasgow Prestwick Airport, or the docks at Greenock, Hunterston and Braehead, to bypass the Glasgow city centre section of the M8. At the Public Inquiry into the road scheme, critics countered that this would mean an increase in ground-level traffic in the Tradeston area as commuters attempted to gain access to the bridge's access ramps. Prior to the M74 completion, a solution to the congestion problems was the Clyde Arc or "Squinty Bridge", which opened in September 2006 – this route was expected to take at least some of the local short-distance traffic away from the Kingston. The M74 extension opened on 28 June 2011.

There is a dubious urban myth that the fourth man in the Williamwood bank robbery, Archie McGeachy, is buried in the pillars of the bridge. It features  in the music video for the Simple Minds single "Speed Your Love to Me".

References

External links
Glasgow Motorway Archive - Kingston Bridge and Approaches
Glasgow City Council page on Transport in Glasgow
'Chroma Streams: Tide and Traffic' - lighting art project
Photograph of the Kingston Bridge in Glasgow

Design and Construction of Kingston Bridge and Elevated Approach Roads, Glasgow.

Bridges in Glasgow
Bridges across the River Clyde
Motorway bridges in Scotland
Bridges completed in 1969
1969 establishments in Scotland